USS Freehold (SP-347) was a minesweeper and tug that served in the United States Navy from 1917 to 1919.
 
Freehold was built as a commercial tug of the same name in 1903 by Neafie and Levy at Philadelphia. On 17 September 1917, the U.S. Navy chartered her for use as a minesweeper and tug during World War I. She was commissioned on 22 September 1917 as USS Freehold (SP-347).

Assigned to the 3rd Naval District, Freehold performed minesweeping duties in the New York City area for the remainder of World War I, sweeping and buoying channels daily for convoys entering and leaving New York Harbor. She also performed general tug duties through the end of the war and into 1919.

On 17 April 1919, Freehold was assisting in the docking of the British Cunard Line passenger ship RMS Saxonia when one of Saxonias propellers struck her. Freehold sank, with the loss of one of her crew members.

Freehold was refloated, overhauled, and returned to her owner on 27 May 1919.

References

NavSource Online: Section Patrol Craft Photo Archive: Freehold (SP 347)

Minesweepers of the United States Navy
Tugs of the United States Navy
World War I minesweepers of the United States
World War I auxiliary ships of the United States
1903 ships
Ships built by Neafie and Levy
Ships sunk in collisions
Maritime incidents in 1919